William Churchill, FRAI, AIA, AAG (October 5, 1859 – June 9, 1920) was an American Polynesian ethnologist and philologist, born in Brooklyn, New York, and educated at Yale, where he wrote for campus humor magazine The Yale Record.  In 1896 he became consul general to Samoa.  In 1897 his commission was extended, making him also Consul General to Tonga.  In 1902 he began working for New York Sun, where he later became a member of the editorial staff. In 1915, he took a position as research associate in primitive philology at the Carnegie Institution in Washington, D.C.

While working for the Committee on Public Information during World War I, he suffered a skull fracture inflicted by an enemy spy.

Churchill was the author of:
 A Princess of Fiji (1892)
Samoa o le Vavau (1902)
 The Polynesian Wanderings, Tracks of the Migration Deduced from an Examination of the Proto-Samoan Content of Efaté and other Languages of Melanesia (1910)
 Beach-la-Mar, the Jargon or Trade Speech of the Western Pacific (1911)
 Easter Island, Rapanui Speech and the Peopling of Southeast Polynesia (1912)
 The Subanu, Studies of a Sub-Visayan Mountain Folk of Mindanao (1913)

References

External links
William Churchill (1916) "Samoan Kava Custom", Holmes Anniversary Volume  (Google eBook)
William Churchill (1917) Club Types of Nuclear Polynesia, The Carnegie Institution of Washington (Google eBook)

1859 births
1920 deaths
American ethnologists
American diplomats
American philologists
American political writers
American male non-fiction writers
Writers from New York (state)
Recipients of the Order of Leopold II